The AEG Dr.I was a triplane fighter of World War I, based on the D.I. Only a single prototype was built and its poor performance meant that no production ensued. The Dr.I was a Dreidecker (triplane) variant of the D.I and had been inspired by a Sopwith Triplane that had been captured intact. A number of proposals for fighters with comparable characteristics were put forward, and AEG's contribution to the program appeared in October 1917. Other than the triple wing it was a D.I, the aircraft had the same fuselage, engine and twin gun armament of its earlier brethren.

Specifications (AEG Dr.I)

See also

References

Notes

Further reading
 Kroschel, Günter; Stützer, Helmut: Die deutschen Militärflugzeuge 1910–18, Wilhelmshaven 1977
 Munson, Kenneth: Bomber 1914–19, Zürich 1968, Nr. 20
 Nowarra, Heinz: Die Entwicklung der Flugzeuge 1914–18, München 1959
 Sharpe, Michael: Doppeldecker, Dreifachdecker & Wasserflugzeuge, Gondrom, Bindlach 2001,

External links

AEG Dr. I — The Virtual Aviation Museum

Dr.I
1910s German fighter aircraft
Triplanes